The Men of Understanding (in Latin Homines Intelligentiae) is the name assumed by a heretical sect (from the Catholic point of view) in the Low Countries, which in 1410-11 was cited before the Inquisition at Brussels.

History
The sect was doctrinally related with the earlier Brethren of the Free Spirit. It taught the eventual salvation of all human beings and even of the demons, maintained that the soul of man cannot be defiled by bodily sin, and believed in a mystical state of illumination and union with God so perfect that it exempted from all subjection to moral and ecclesiastical laws and was an infallible pledge of salvation.
 
Both its leaders, Egidius Cantoris, an illiterate layman, and the Carmelite William of Hildernissen, near Bergen-op-Zoom, gloried in the visions with which they claimed to have been favoured. Cantoris in a moment of religious exaltation went so far as to run nude through the streets of Brussels, declaring himself the saviour of mankind.
 
About 1410 Peter d'Ailly, Bishop of Cambrai, seems to have taken the first steps towards the suppression of the heresy. William of Hildernissen consented to a retraction, the sincerity of which appeared doubtful. In 1411, a second investigation resulted in another retraction, but also in a sentence compelling William to return permanently to an extra-diocesan Carmelite monastery after three years' detention in one of the episcopal castles. Nothing is known about the result of the inquisitorial procedure against the other members of the sect.

Sources

15th-century Catholicism
15th-century Christianity
Heresy in Christianity in the Middle Ages